This is a list of video game remakes and remastered ports.

This list includes remakes as well as remastered or enhanced ports of video games. It does not include clones.

List

See also
 High-definition remasters for PlayStation consoles

References

Further reading
 

Remakes